Swarup Chatterjee (born 21 June 1976) is a painter turned photographer living in Mumbai, India.

Life and work
Chatterjee started his career as a journalist working with Indian newspapers including The Asian Age and The Economic Times. He travels to many parts of the world on photographic expeditions.

Swarup is course director at PhotoTrainings, which runs weekend photography workshops.

He has designed film posters for both feature and short Indian films apart from an art archival project with veteran Indian film actor and painter Deepti Naval.

Awards 
 Nomination in the Black & Spider Awards, 2015, Los Angeles.
 Honourable Mentions in "Portrait"  and "People"  categories in the Monochrome Awards, 2016, international contest.
 Winner and Honorable Mention in the Abstract category - 11th Black & White Spider Awards, 2016, Los Angeles.
 3 nominations in the 11th Black & White Spider Awards, 2016, Los Angeles.
 Editor's choice entry in the LensCulture Street Photography awards, 2016.

References

External links 
 
 Photography feature by BoredPanda
 Profile feature by Sunday Chronicle

Photographers from Maharashtra